The juguloomohyoid lymph node (tongue node) is related to the intermediate tendon of the omohyoid muscle. It is designated as one of the deep cervical lymph nodes. As it is associated with the lymph drainage of the tongue if enlarged, it can be a sign of a tongue carcinoma.

Lymphatics of the head and neck